Zabolotye is a rural locality (a village) and the administrative center of Zachachyevskoye Rural Settlement of Kholmogorsky District, Arkhangelsk Oblast, Russia. The population was 390 as of 2010.

Geography 
Zabolotye is located on the Bolshaya Chacha River, 115 km south of Kholmogory (the district's administrative centre) by road. Kuliga is the nearest rural locality.

References 

Rural localities in Kholmogorsky District